Greene County is a county located on the southeast border of the U.S. state of Mississippi. As of the 2020 census, the population was 13,530. Its county seat is Leakesville. Established in 1811, the county was named for General Nathanael Greene of the American Revolutionary War.

History
Historically this area of the state was occupied by the Choctaw people, who constituted the largest tribe. French, Spanish and English colonists traded with them in the early colonial years. in 1830, President Andrew Jackson gained passage of the Indian Removal Act by Congress, and proceeded to force the Choctaw and other of the Five Civilized Tribes out of the Southeast to lands west of the Mississippi River. The land was sold to European-American settlers.

County boundaries went through numerous changes as population increased and new counties were created. Along with neighboring Jones and Perry counties, Greene is characterized by its sandy soil and Piney Woods. These characteristics limited the productivity of farming.

The county economy originally depended on subsistence farmers who ran herds of cattle and hogs, which were allowed to roam freely in the pine forests and bush. Together with the game they hunted, residents sold the meat animals to markets in Mobile, Alabama, the nearest commercial center. While some farmers tried to cultivate cotton because of the high prices when the market was strong, most in this area had small farms and the owners held few enslaved African Americans. The soil did not support very successful cotton crops; in 1860 only 16 of the 213 farmers in this county raised cotton.

Geography

Major highways
  U.S. Highway 45
  U.S. Highway 98
  Mississippi Highway 42
  Mississippi Highway 57
  Mississippi Highway 63

Adjacent counties
 Wayne County (north)
 Washington County, Alabama (northeast)
 Mobile County, Alabama (southeast)
 George County (south)
 Perry County (west)

National protected area
 De Soto National Forest (part)

Demographics
The rural county had strong declines in population from 1940 to 1960, a period when many African Americans left for the West Coast in the second wave of the Great Migration. The buildup of defense industries in California and other states before and during World War II attracted many migrants for work opportunities.

2000 census
As of the census of 2000, there were 13,299 people, 4,148 households, and 3,152 families residing in the county.  The population density was 19 people per square mile (7/km2).  There were 4,947 housing units at an average density of 7 per square mile (3/km2).  The racial makeup of the county was 72.79% White, 26.18% Black or African American, 0.23% Native American, 0.07% Asian, 0.03% Pacific Islander, 0.31% from other races, and 0.38% from two or more races.  0.80% of the population were Hispanic or Latino of any race.

There were 4,148 households, out of which 37.20% had children under the age of 18 living with them, 61.20% were married couples living together, 11.90% had a female householder with no husband present, and 24.00% were non-families. 22.00% of all households were made up of individuals, and 9.30% had someone living alone who was 65 years of age or older.  The average household size was 2.67 and the average family size was 3.12.

In the county, the population was spread out, with 24.10% under the age of 18, 13.10% from 18 to 24, 32.10% from 25 to 44, 20.60% from 45 to 64, and 10.10% who were 65 years of age or older.  The median age was 32 years. For every 100 females there were 130.00 males.  For every 100 females age 18 and over, there were 141.00 males.

The median income for a household in the county was $28,336, and the median income for a family was $33,037. Males had a median income of $30,189 versus $17,935 for females. The per capita income for the county was $11,868.  About 16.50% of families and 19.60% of the population were below the poverty line, including 25.30% of those under age 18 and 21.10% of those age 65 or over.

2015
 the largest self-reported ancestry groups in Greene County, Mississippi are:
 African - 26.18%
 English - 18.9%
 American - 17.6%
 Irish - 7.9%
 German - 4.9%
 Scots-Irish - 4.0%
 Scottish - 3.4%
 French (except Basque) - 1.5%
 Dutch - 1.1%
 Italian - 0.7%
 Welsh - 0.4%
 French-Canadian - 0.1%
 Russian - 0.1%
 Norwegian - 0.1%

2020 census

As of the 2020 United States census, there were 13,530 people, 3,925 households, and 2,624 families residing in the county.

Government and infrastructure
The Mississippi Department of Corrections South Mississippi Correctional Institution is located in an unincorporated area of Greene County. It opened in 1990. In the early 21st century, it has an inmate population of more than 3,000 men, which has added markedly to the total population of the county. Its inmates constitute approximately 21 percent of the state's total prisoners. Numerous residents of the rural county are employed at the prison.

The Greene County School District includes: Greene County High School, Greene County Vocational-Technical School, Leakesville Elementary School, Leakesville Junior High School, McLain Attendance Center, and Sand Hill Attendance Center.

Communities

Towns
 Leakesville (county seat)
 McLain
 State Line (partly in Wayne County)

Census-designated places
 Leaf

Unincorporated communities
 Avera
 Neely
 Piave
 Sand Hill
 Vernal

Politics

Education
Greene County School District is the only school district.

See also

 National Register of Historic Places listings in Greene County, Mississippi

References

External links
 George County Courthouse Pictures

 
Mississippi counties
Populated places established in 1811
1811 establishments in Mississippi Territory